Álvaro Santos Pereira (Viseu, 7 January 1972) is a Portuguese economist, professor and writer. He was the Minister of Economy, Labour, Transport, Public Works and Communications of Portugal between June 2011 and July 2013 in the XIX Constitutional Government of Portugal.

Mr. Álvaro Santos Pereira did not complete his mandate as Minister and instead was reshuffled. 

His tenure as Minister became known due to his initial aggressive stance against the energy lobby - led by EDP - Electricidade de Portugal - and conciliatory settlement in the end.  

The negotiations regarding excessive rents led by Mr. Álvaro Santos Pereira, resulted in EDP receiving less €30 million p.a. It now appears that excessive rents being charged by EDP could have amounted to €2 billion. 

Moreover, Mr. Álvaro Santos Pereira, when in office, prohibited his Secretary of State, Mr. Henrique Gomes, of presenting independent analysis on excessive rents and discussing this in public so as not to impact the valuation of EDP and that e success of the last phase of its privatisation. As a result, Secretary of State Mr. Henrique Gomes resigned as per his declaration at a public hearing on excessive rents and potential collusion between the Ministry of Economy and EDP in the parliament.

Career
Álvaro Santos Pereira was born in Viseu, Portugal in 1972.  He attended the University of Coimbra in Coimbra, where he was awarded a degree in economics by the Faculdade de Economia da Universidade de Coimbra (FEUC) (Economics School of the University of Coimbra) and has a master's degree by the University of Exeter.  He is also a PhD in economics by the Simon Fraser University (British Columbia, Canada). He has been a professor of economic development and economic policy at the Simon Fraser University and the University of British Columbia.

In June 2011, he was appointed Minister of Economy, Labour, Transport, Public Works and Communications of Portugal in the cabinet of Prime Minister Pedro Passos Coelho.

Effective 1 April 2014, he is Director of the Country Studies Branch of the OECD Economics Department.

References

Government ministers of Portugal
20th-century Portuguese economists
Portuguese male writers
1972 births
People from Viseu
University of Coimbra alumni
Simon Fraser University alumni
Academic staff of the University of British Columbia
Academic staff of Simon Fraser University
Living people
21st-century Portuguese economists